Corydalla may refer to:
Agyrta, a genus of moths
Corydala, a city of ancient Lycia